Helvi Juvonen (5 November 1919, Iisalmi, Northern Savonia –  1 October 1959) was a Finnish writer and recipient of the Eino Leino Prize in 1957.

She is buried in the Hietaniemi Cemetery in Helsinki.

References

Further reading
 

1919 births
1959 deaths
People from Iisalmi
Writers from North Savo
Finnish writers
Finnish LGBT writers
Recipients of the Eino Leino Prize
Burials at Hietaniemi Cemetery
20th-century Finnish LGBT people